Enigmofusus beckii is a species of sea snail, a marine gastropod mollusk in the family Fasciolariidae, the spindle snails, the tulip snails and their allies.

References

 Vermeij G.J. & Snyder M.A. (2018). Proposed genus-level classification of large species of Fusininae (Gastropoda, Fasciolariidae). Basteria. 82(4-6): 57-82.

External links
 Reeve L.A. (1847-1848). Monograph of the genus Fusus. In: Conchologia Iconica, vol. 4, pls 1-21 and unpaginated text. L. Reeve & Co., London

beckii
Gastropods described in 1848